Kevin MacPhee is an American professional poker player.  MacPhee is currently living in Coeur D'Alene and traveling around the world playing in highest level poker games.

Early years and poker career 
Kevin started playing poker during his college years.  But in 2003, after Chris Moneymaker won the main event at the WSOP, he decided to make a transition from Magic: the Gathering to playing poker. 

He has been a professional since April 2008, when he broke the PokerStars TLB record and won over $100,000. Ever since he never stopped traveling and playing in live events.

Achievements 
In March 2010 Kevin MacPhee won the EPT Berlin Season 6 Main Event. In an interview he said: "I am a luck-sack. What can I say? I ran extremely good and I had the nuts every time someone played back at me." He was 29 years old by that time. This was his first huge poker success. He has more than 20 notable EPT cashes as he is seen in almost each EPT season since 2008.

In June 2015 he got his first bracelet, winning the Event 56: $5,000 Turbo No-Limit Hold'em for $490,900. In October 2015 he won his second bracelet, winning the WSOP Europe Main Event for $1,001,577.

As of June 2015, his total live tournament winnings exceed $5,500,000.

Kevin MacPhee was the EPT Player's Choice Award Winner for 2010.

References

American poker players
World Series of Poker bracelet winners
European Poker Tour winners
People from Coeur d'Alene, Idaho
Living people
Year of birth missing (living people)